Iván Navarro Pastor (born 19 October 1981) is a retired professional tennis player from Spain. He was sponsored by Head and Li-Ning for his racquets and attire. He employed the serve-and-volley strategy, very much like his compatriot Feliciano López. During his playing career, he had a unique habit of changing racquets each game, using one racquet for serving and another for returning. He reached a career high singles ranking of 67 in March 2009.

He defeated Ivo Karlović in the first round of the 2009 US Open before falling to former World No. 21 Taylor Dent in a five-set match in the second round.  Navarro saved three match points in the decisive fifth-set tiebreak against Dent before the American hit a return winner to close out the match, 6–4, 5–7, 6–7(1), 7–5, 7–6(9).  Navarro announced his retirement in April 2013.

Performance timeline

Singles

ATP Challenger and ITF Futures finals

Singles: 29 (15–14)

Doubles: 15 (8–7)

References

External links
 
 
 Navarro World Ranking History

1981 births
Living people
Sportspeople from Alicante
Spanish male tennis players
Tennis players from the Valencian Community